United Arab Emirates competed at the 2017 Asian Indoor and Martial Arts Games held in Ashgabat, Turkmenistan from September 17 to 27. UAE sent a delegation consisting of 52 competitors for the multi-sport event.

Emirati participants won 9 medals in the competition including 5 gold medals.

Participants

Medalists

References 

Nations at the 2017 Asian Indoor and Martial Arts Games
2017 in Emirati sport